Kaidi Jekimova (born 28 June 1979) is a retired Estonian footballer who played as an attacking midfielder. She played 68 times for the Estonian women's national football team.

References

External links

1979 births
Living people
Estonian women's footballers
Estonian people of Russian descent
Estonia women's international footballers
Women's association football midfielders
FC Levadia Tallinn (women) players